The Lockheed L-649 Constellation was the first real civilian version of the Lockheed Constellation line, as the Lockheed L-049 Constellation was a simple redesign from the military Lockheed C-69 Constellation. The L-649 was planned to be the new standard version of the Constellation, but the L-749 Constellation, a co-jointly produced improved derivative, was chosen over the L-649 by most airlines. Most of the few L-649 aircraft built were delivered and operated by Eastern Air Lines.

History

When Curtiss-Wright offered an improved version of the Wright R-3350 Duplex-Cyclone, Lockheed began developing an improved version of the L-049 Constellation airliner to be powered by this engine. The new project was designated L-049-84. In addition to the engine change, the wing and fuselage structure were strengthened to allow an increased gross weight. The cabin was redesigned and made more luxurious, incorporating changes such as retractable overhead sleeping berths, modernised air conditioning and retractable seats. Ten different cabin layouts were offered. Due to the loudness of the R-3350 engines, the insulation had been augmented through the use of multiple materials including non-inflammable cloth and fiberglass. The problem of overheating that plagued the original engines had been eliminated through the newer design of the R-3350 and the oil tanks being moved away from the engine nacelles. The oil tank capacity was also increased by 9 gallons. The payload was increased by 1,846 pounds. An extra removable cargo hold was designed to increase the payload of the aircraft. This was called a "Speedpak", and was to be used for shorter flights. The result was a completely new design, causing Lockheed to redesignate the aircraft L-649 due to the significant changes.

The first L-649 flew on October 19, 1946, and it received its certification in May 1947. The first L-649 was also delivered to Eastern Air Lines in May 1947. Eastern had modified its original order for 14 L-049 Constellations to 14 L-649 Constellations. Eastern was also the only airline to receive the L-649 straight from the production line itself, as Trans World Airlines and Air France converted their ordered L-649 aircraft into the improved derivative, the L-749 Constellation, which was to be produced alongside the L-649. In fact, the L-749 entered service a month before the L-649 did. A further incident occurred when TWA suffered a pilots' strike, causing them to cancel the original order for 8 L-049 and 18 L-649 aircraft. Only 16 original L-649 aircraft were produced. Six others were converted to L-649A standard and delivered to Chicago and Southern Air Lines. Most of the L-649 and L-649A aircraft would later be converted to L-749 and L-749A standards. When Chicago and Southern merged with Delta in 1953, several of these airplanes were sold to TWA.

Variants

L-649
Standard production version, powered by four R-3350-749C18BD-1 engines. 16 built.

L-649A
Strengthened structure and extra fuel capacity for longer distances. 6 built.

Specifications (L-649)

See also

References
Notes

Bibliography
Breffort, Dominique. Lockheed Constellation: from Excalibur to Starliner Civilian and Military Variants. Paris: Histoire and Collecions, 2006. Print.

External links

Lockheed Constellation Survivors - A website with information and whereabouts of surviving Constellations of all variants, including the L-649 Constellation.

Constellation
1940s United States airliners
Four-engined tractor aircraft
Low-wing aircraft
L-0649
Aircraft first flown in 1946
Four-engined piston aircraft
Triple-tail aircraft

de:Lockheed Constellation
it:Lockheed L-049 Constellation